Hamza Aktan (born 10.12.1983, Yüksekova, Turkey) is a Kurdish journalist and writer.

He studied journalism in Istanbul at Marmara University and law at Cyprus' Near East University. He is the author of a book titled Kürt Vatandaş (Turkish: The Kurdish Citizen). He has worked for several Turkish publications including Bianet, BirGün, Post Express, Nokta, Yeni Şafak, Toplumsal Tarih and IMC TV as correspondent, editor and lastly, news director. He also has contributed to some other Turkish publications including Birikim, haysiyet.com, and Radikal.

References

Living people
1983 births
Kurdish journalists